Bridesmaids is a 1989 drama film, written by Bett Eyre, directed by Lila Garrett, starring Shelley Hack, Brooke Adams, Audra Lindley, Jack Coleman and Sela Ward.


Plot
Four women who were best friends in high school rejoin after a 20 years estrangement for the wedding of their fifth friend. The share secrets and stories about their old school days, and learn not everything was always as it seemed.  As they explore the town, their secrets, and their lives they become stronger and happier friends.

Cast
 Shelley Hack as Kimberly
 Sela Ward as Caryl
 Stephanie Faracy as Beth
 Brooke Adams as Pat
 Jack Coleman as Matt
 Audra Lindley as Lulu
 Hamilton Camp as Ridgefield
 James F. Dean as Officer John
 Randy Ser as Clerk
 Kathryn Kimler as Teen Driver

External links
 
 

1989 television films
1989 films
CBS network films
1980s English-language films
1989 crime drama films